SECCA may refer to:

 Southeastern Center for Contemporary Art
 The  SECCA procedure, a surgical treatment for fecal incontinence.